Pseudoschismatomma is a monotypic fungal genus in the family Roccellaceae. It contains the single species Pseudoschismatomma rufescens, a corticolous (bark-dwelling), crustose lichen. This species was first described in 1794 by Christiaan Hendrik Persoon as Opegrapha rufescens. Pseudoschismatomma was circumscribed in 2014 by Damien Ernst and Anders Tehler, following molecular phylogenetic analysis and revision of the Roccellaceae. The genus name alludes to its similarity with genus Schismatomma, particularly S. graphidioides. It differs from this species in having a distinct brown true .

References

Roccellaceae
Lichen genera
Taxa described in 2014
Arthoniomycetes genera